Juana Fe is a Chilean musical band that mixes popular Latin American rhythms such as salsa and cumbia with Jamaican ska. Alongside other New Chilean Cumbia bands such as La Mano Ajena, Tizana and Chico Trujillo, they form part of the new wave of Latin American fusion that became popular in the first decade of the 21st century. Juana Fe’s music is influenced by urban life and the political and social environment in Chile.

History
Juana Fe was formed in 2004 when fellow university students Juan Ayala, Jaime Concha and Gonzalo Ibáñez decided to dedicate themselves completely to music, living communally in a house in Barrio Brasil, and paying rent by selling soy hamburgers on the university circuit. They were soon joined by percussionists and Rodrigo Rojas on keyboards. Juana Fe began to improvise with popular rhythms, creating what they themselves termed the Afrorumba chilenera (Chilean Afro-rumba), and performing in the peripheral neighbourhoods of the Chilean capital. That same year, Juana Fe obtained a grant from the National Arts Development Fund (Fondo Nacional de Desarrollo Cultural de las Artes, FONDART) which they used to record their first album, Con los pies en el barrio (“With your feet in the ‘hood”). In 2007 they launched the album Afrorumba chilenera, featuring the hit song Callejero, which led them to perform at two of the most important concerts in Chile: the Olmué Huaso Festival and the Viña del Mar International Song Festival. Juana Fe's latest album, La Makinita (2010), incorporates more diverse influences such as hip hop and salsa, and lyrics offering social commentary.

Juana Fe has toured Europe, performing at 30 events and participating in 15 festivals, including the Glastonbury music festival in 2011.

The band has also performed throughout Latin America and within their native Chile, offering a large number of free concerts.

Discography

Albums

Con los pies en el barrio (2004, FONDART) 

 Barrio viejo
 Loco pato
 Peligro
 La calavera amarilla
 Digame lo que va a pasar
 Pa que no se olvide
 La esquina de la desgracia
 Juan
 El alma de mis muertos
 Savia nueva

Afrorumba chilenera (2007, Sello Azul) 

 Callejero
 ChinChin
 Afrorumbachilenera
 El Volcán
 El que te quiere te quiere
 La Teleraña
 La Dormida
 Los Tambores
 Andrea
 Chilian suin

La makinita (2010) 

 La makinita
 Del fin del mundo
 Tengo luquita
 Yankee man
 No era Cecilia
 La bala
 Bombo y guitarra
 Un papel es un papel
 Masari Chin chin
 Chiquitita
 Click click
 Venga mi vida
 La jardinera
 Zig zag
 Bajando por el zig zag

Maleducao (2016) 

 A quemar el sol
 Enloqueciendo
 Maleducao
 Cimarrón
 Una Volada
 Sirena
 La flor del desierto
 Cualquiera puede bailar
 Tráiganme la medicina

See also
New Chilean Cumbia

References

External links
Official website

Chilean musical groups
Chilean cumbia